GP Liberty Seguros  (officially GP Liberty Seguros - Troféu Alpendre) is a road bicycle race held annually in Portugal since 2009. It is organized as a 2.2 event on the UCI Europe Tour.

Winners

References

UCI Europe Tour races
Cycle races in Portugal
Recurring sporting events established in 2009
2009 establishments in Portugal
Spring (season) events in Portugal